Geoffrey Allan Collins (10 June 1918 – 25 September 2008) was an English cricketer.  Collins was a right-handed batsman.

Biography
He was born in Brighton, Sussex.

He made a single first-class appearance for Sussex against Oxford University in 1939.  In this match, he scored 2 runs in Sussex's first-innings, before being dismissed by David Macindoe, while in their second-innings the same bowler dismissed him for 17.  Oxford University won the match by 56 runs.

He died at Godmanchester, Huntingdonshire on 25 September 2008.

References

External links
Geoffrey Collins at ESPNcricinfo
Geoffrey Collins at CricketArchive

1918 births
2008 deaths
Sportspeople from Brighton
English cricketers
Sussex cricketers